A by-election was held for the New South Wales Legislative Assembly seat of Ku-ring-gai on Saturday, 22 August 1992.

It was triggered by the resignation on 24 June 1992 of Liberal Party Premier, Nick Greiner, after the scandal known as the 'Metherell affair'. The seat was subsequently won by Stephen O'Doherty of the Liberal Party. However the Liberals suffered a 14% drop in their primary vote, and a 17% drop in their two party preferred vote.

Background

The seat of Ku-ring-gai, a traditionally safe Liberal seat, was held since 1980 by Nick Greiner, who had been Premier of New South Wales since 1988. However, with the hung parliament result of the 1991 election, Greiner's performance in government had become dependent on the support of the few independent members of the legislative assembly. With the resignation from the party of former minister Terry Metherell in October 1991, the government's majority became even tighter. The government subsequently created a job for Metherell, a position with the Environment Protection Agency, which he accepted, effectively engineering a vacancy in a seat the Liberal Party would recover at a by-election.

While the Liberal Party won the by-election, there was a much higher cost. Because the Greiner government was in a minority, it could not prevent the Legislative Assembly referring the matter of Metherell's appointment to the Independent Commission Against Corruption, which made findings of corruption. These findings were eventually ruled by the Supreme Court of New South Wales as being outside the powers of the ICAC to make, but by then Premier Greiner had already resigned as Premier and an MP after the four independent MPs threatened to bring down the government if Greiner stayed in office.

Results
The Liberal Party retained the seat, despite a 2PP swing of 17%. The Liberal candidate, Journalist Stephen O'Doherty, was declared the winner against Independent Candidate, Mick Gallagher. The Labor Party did not field a candidate.

Nick Greiner resigned after the scandal known as the 'Metherell affair'.

See also
Electoral results for the district of Ku-ring-gai
List of New South Wales state by-elections

References

New South Wales state by-elections
1992 elections in Australia
1990s in New South Wales